The girls competition of the skeleton events at the 2012 Winter Youth Olympics in Innsbruck, Austria, was held on January 21, at the Olympic Sliding Centre Innsbruck. 14 athletes from 10 different countries took part in this event. The first run was cancelled.

Results

References

olympedia.org

Skeleton at the 2012 Winter Youth Olympics